Sam Born (September 10, 1891 – March 23, 1959) was an American businessman, candy maker and inventor.

Biography
Samuel Bernstein was born into a Jewish family in Vinnitsia, Russian Empire (now Vinnytsia in Ukraine).  He had been a rabbinical student from Berdichev, Ukraine, before his family fled to Paris, where he learned the art of chocolate-making.

Under his original name Samuel Bernstein, he immigrated to the United States in December 1909. He sailed on the S/S Merion from Liverpool to Philadelphia; on the ship's passenger list, his occupation was listed as "candy maker".

In 1916, Sam Born was awarded the "key to the city" of San Francisco for inventing a machine that mechanically inserted sticks into lollipops.

In 1923, he founded Just Born company in Brooklyn, New York; a candy manufacturer that still manufactures Peeps, Mike and Ike, and Hot Tamales.  After opening a factory and store in Brooklyn, Sam brought his brothers-in-law, Irv and Jack Shaffer, into the business. He relocated the firm to Bethlehem, Pennsylvania in 1932. 

In March 1959, Born died on board the Cunard liner, Britannic, while it was at sea, having departed from Lisbon en route to Southampton. He and his wife were on the last lap of a 14,000 mile world cruise, according to his obituary which appeared in The Morning Call, on March 24, 1959.

A nephew, David Shaffer, is currently board chair and co-CEO of Just Born.

References 

1891 births
1959 deaths
People from Vinnytsia
People from Vinnitsky Uyezd
Ukrainian Jews
Jews from the Russian Empire
Emigrants from the Russian Empire to the United States
American people of Ukrainian-Jewish descent
Jewish American inventors
20th-century American businesspeople
20th-century American inventors
20th-century American Jews
American food company founders
Businesspeople from New York City
Businesspeople from Pennsylvania
Businesspeople in confectionery
People from Bethlehem, Pennsylvania
People from Brooklyn
People who died at sea